Ilya Yurievich Yukhimuk (born 18 February 1997) is a Belarusian ice dancer. With his skating partner, Viktoria Semenjuk, he has won five senior international medals and is the 2021 Belarusian national champion.

Earlier in his career, he competed for China with Feng Yuhan.

Programs 
 With Semenjuk

Competitive highlights 
GP: Grand Prix; CS: Challenger Series

 With Semenjuk

 Men's singles

Detailed results 
ISU Personal Bests highlighted in bold.

 With Semenjuk

References

External links 
 
 

1997 births
Living people
Belarusian male ice dancers
Sportspeople from Brest, Belarus